Bač may refer to:

Places

In Montenegro:
Bač, Montenegro, in the northeastern part of the country

In North Macedonia: 
Bač, North Macedonia, a village and former municipality

In Serbia:
Bač, Serbia, a town and municipality in the South Bačka District
Bač Fortress, a fortress

In Slovakia:
Báč, a village

In Slovenia:
Bač, Ilirska Bistrica, a village in the Municipality of Ilirska Bistrica
Bač pri Materiji, a settlement in the Municipality of Hrpelje–Kozina

Names
Bač (name), a Slavic name

See also

BAC (disambiguation)